CGEA may refer to:

Aviation
Compagnie des Grands Express Aériens - a defunct French airline
Compagnie Générale d'Entreprises Aéronautiques - a defunct French airline

Other
Canadian Geothermal Energy Association